Sah Mal (also known as Shah Mal Singh) (1797 — 18 July 1857) was a rebel at the time of the Indian Rebellion of 1857, based out of the village of Bijrol, Uttar Pradesh. He led the Jats of Baraut in rebellion against the East India Company.

In June 1857, Sah Mal Singh seized 500 head of cattle, and collected escaped convicts and other locals and formed a force. On 18 July, British forces came under attack as they approached the village of Baraut. A group of fighters led by Sah Mal took up positions in a nearby orchard, and came under pressed attack by a Rifles unit. The Jat formation broke, and were attacked on the flank by mounted troops. Hand-to-hand combat ensued, during which Sah Mal was killed.

References

Further reading

Indian independence activists
Revolutionaries of the Indian Rebellion of 1857
1857 deaths
Guerrillas killed in action
People from Bagpat district